John McDaid (1909 – unknown) was an Irish footballer who played in the Football League for Stoke City.

Career
Born in Derry, Ireland McDaid played football for Drumcondra and Heptonstall, before being given a chance at Stoke City. He made just four appearances for Stoke over two years and moved back to Ireland with Crusaders.

Career statistics

References

Stoke City F.C. players
English Football League players
1909 births
Year of death missing
Crusaders F.C. players
Drumcondra F.C. players
Association football forwards
Republic of Ireland association footballers